Staroyamurzino (İśke Yamurźa) is a rural locality (a village) in Seytyakovsky Selsoviet, Baltachevsky District, Bashkortostan, Russia. The population was 162 as of 2010. There are 2 streets.

Geography 
Staroyamurzino is located 10 km southwest of Starobaltachevo (the district's administrative centre) by road. Usmanovo is the nearest rural locality.

References 

Rural localities in Baltachevsky District